John Bowman may refer to:

John Bowman (actor) (1651–1739), British stage actor
John Bowman (Nevada politician) (1824/25–1899), American lawyer, served as member and speaker of the Nevada Assembly
John Bowman (broadcaster) (born 1942), Irish historian and broadcaster
John Bowman (Canadian football) (born 1982), currently with the Montreal Alouettes
John Bowman (Canadian politician), mill owner and reeve of the Township of Markham, Ontario
John Bowman (entrepreneur), co-founder of Chrome Hearts
John Bowman (footballer) (1879–1943), English football player and manager
John Bowman (pastoralist) (1828–1900), South Australian pioneer
John Bowman (pioneer) (1738–1784), Virginia and Kentucky soldier and official
John Bowman (New York politician) (1782–1853), New York politician, served in both houses of the state legislature
John Bowman (screenwriter) (1957–2021), writer for Saturday Night Live
John Bryan Bowman (1824–1891), Kentucky educator, founder of Kentucky University 
John Eddowes Bowman the Elder (1785–1841), British banker and naturalist
John Eddowes Bowman the Younger (1819–1854), English chemist
John Gabbert Bowman (1877–1962), American educator
John McEntee Bowman (1875–1931), American hotelier
John F. Bowman (1880–1960), American politician and mayor of Salt Lake City
John Bowman, 4th Baronet (1904–1994), of the Bowman baronets
John Bowman (1701–1797), Lord Provost of Glasgow

See also 
Jonathan Philbin Bowman (1969–2000), Irish journalist
Jack Bowman (born 1932), American politician
Bowman (disambiguation)